This list of Vogue Czechoslovakia cover models is a catalog of cover models who have appeared on the cover of Vogue Czechoslovakia, Czech Republic and Slovakia edition of Vogue magazine, starting with the magazine's first issue in September 2018.

2018

2019

2020

2021

2022

References

External links
Vogue Czechoslovakia website
Conde Nast launches Vogue in the Czech Republic and Slovakia

CS
Vogue
Czech fashion